The East River Soccer Complex is an expansive, six field complex in Bluefield, West Virginia that is host to several teams of the Bluefield micropolitan area. Youth, middle school, high school, and adult recreational soccer is held at the complex and is regulated by The East River Soccer Association. Field 1 is home to the Southern West Virginia King's Warriors that are a member of the USL Premier Development League. 2014 was the first season for the King's Warriors in Bluefield after a move from the Beckley YMCA, their home for two years. Five of East River's fields are full size which allows college and high school games to take place at the same time.

Fields
Field 1 is full length and features bleachers, a concession stand, press box, locker rooms, and an officials hospitality area. Field 2 is full size and offers bleachers as well. Field 3 is mainly used for the youth recreational leagues that take place at the complex. Fields 4, 5, and 6 are full size and are used for games and training. The complex was the site of the USCAA National Soccer Championship hosted by Bluefield College in 2004.

References

External links
 Southern West Virginia King's Warriors Website
 Bluefield College Men's Soccer Website

Soccer venues in West Virginia
College soccer venues in the United States
Buildings and structures in Bluefield, West Virginia
Sports complexes in the United States